The Australian national cricket team visited Zimbabwe in October 1999. They played a one Test and three One Day Internationals (ODIs) against the Zimbabwean national cricket team. Australia won the Test series 1–0 and the ODI series 3–0. Australia were captained by Steve Waugh and Zimbabwe by Alistair Campbell. The match was the last of Ian Healy's 119 Tests for Australia.

Test series

Only Test

ODI series

1st ODI

2nd ODI

3rd ODI

References

External links
 Series home at ESPN Cricinfo

1999 in Australian cricket
1999 in Zimbabwean cricket
Australian cricket tours of Zimbabwe
International cricket competitions from 1997–98 to 2000
Zimbabwean cricket seasons from 1980–81 to 1999–2000